The 2018 Women's Tri-Nations Hockey Tournament was an invitational women's field hockey competition, hosted by the New Zealand Hockey Federation. The tournament took place between 19 and 27 May 2018 in Cromwell, New Zealand. A total of three teams competed for the title.

Australia won the tournament by defeating New Zealand 4–1 in the final. Japan finished in third place, after being eliminated by New Zealand in the Semi-final.

Teams
Including New Zealand, 3 teams were invited by the New Zealand Hockey Federation to participate in the tournament.

 
 
  (host nation)

Results

Round Robin

Classification round

Semi-final

Final

Statistics

Final standings

Goalscorers

3 Goals

 Ambrosia Malone
 Brooke Peris
 Samantha Harrison
 Olivia Merry

2 Goals

 Kalindi Commerford
 Jodie Kenny
 Yuri Nagai
 Shihori Oikawa
 Mai Toriyama

1 Goal

 Lily Brazel
 Savannah Fitzpatrick
 Emily Hurtz
 Stephanie Kershaw
 Renee Taylor
 Akiko Kato
 Kanon Mori
 Madison Doar
 Shiloh Gloyn
 Anita McLaren
 Kelsey Smith

References

2018 in women's field hockey
2018 in New Zealand women's sport
2018 in Australian women's field hockey
2018 in Japanese women's sport
2018 Women's Tri-Nations Hockey Tournament
May 2018 sports events in Oceania
Sport in Otago